Frank Olley (18 January 1927 – 21 July 1988) was an Australian politician. Born in Sydney, he was educated at Granville Technical College before becoming an electrical tradesman with the Electricity Commission of New South Wales. He was involved in local politics as a member of Yass Municipal Council. In 1972, he defeated Country Party member, Ian Pettitt, in the seat of Hume, entering the Australian House of Representatives as a member of the Labor Party. He was defeated in 1974 by Country Party candidate, Stephen Lusher. Olley died in 1988.

References

Australian Labor Party members of the Parliament of Australia
Members of the Australian House of Representatives for Hume
Members of the Australian House of Representatives
1927 births
1988 deaths
20th-century Australian politicians
Australian electricians